Sədiyan is a (Hamlet) village situated in the north of the municipality of Diyallı in the Ismailli Rayon of Azerbaijan.

References

Populated places in Ismayilli District